Pygeretmus is a genus of rodent in the family Dipodidae. It contains the following species:
 Lesser fat-tailed jerboa (Pygeretmus platyurus)
 Dwarf fat-tailed jerboa (Pygeretmus pumilio)
 Greater fat-tailed jerboa (Pygeretmus shitkovi)

References

 
Rodent genera
Taxa named by C. L. Gloger
Taxonomy articles created by Polbot